Coming of Age is the original 8-song demo record by alternative rock band Breaking Point, then known as (The) Broken. It was recorded between late-1999 and mid-2000 and was released on January 16, 2001. It was a limited release and is now a sought-after collectible.

History 
After guitar player Justin Rimer got a job at the famous Ardent Studios in Memphis, he became an assistant engineer for such then-emerging acts as 3 Doors Down and Train. Rimmer's time at Ardent led to Broken getting a "spec" (sic) deal at the studio. The result of that deal was the original "Coming of Age", an 8-track demo record that was later the basis for Wind-Up to sign the band. Of the record's 8 tracks, five were later remixed and used on the band's debut L.P also titled "Coming of Age".

The E.P version of "Open Wide" features an extended intro that was cut on the later-released L.P. The song "Under" features feedback and lead guitar lines not present in the L.P version. Additionally, the song features older vocal takes in the verses which were re-recorded for the L.P.

Track listing

Coming of Age is the first album by the alternative rock band Breaking Point, released in 2001.  It was recorded with the band's first drummer Jody Abbott. The album's original release included the first 10 tracks, but after the popularity of "One of a Kind" grew, it was added as the 11th track when Coming of Age was later re-released. The album has gone on to sell over 175,000 copies as of April 2008.

Song appearances 
"One of a Kind" served as the entrance theme of WWF professional wrestler Rob Van Dam in 2001 and was included on the compilation album WWF Forceable Entry. Rob Van Dam also appears in the "One of a Kind" music video, in which he loses his car to the band's lead singer, Brett Erickson, in a street race. At the end of the video, he spin kicks the car keys into his opponent's hands.

Other tracks, such as "Coming of Age" and "Falling Down" were frequently played on Muzak Power Rock station in the early 2000s. "Coming of Age" was also featured in Dragon Ball Z: Lord Slug, "27" was in The Scorpion King and is used as the theme song for Japanese professional wrestler Kota Ibushi,  and "Falling Down," "Under," and "Phoenix" were all included in Dragon Ball Z: Cooler's Revenge.

Track listing

Singles

Personnel 

 Brett Erickson - Vocals, Rhythm guitar
 Justin Rimer - Lead Guitar
 Greg Edmondson - Bass Guitar
 Jody Abbott – Drums
 Chapman Baehler – Photography
 Glen DiCrocco – Photography
 Jim Baldree – Digital Editing
 Jeff Burns – Assistant
 David Campbell – String Arrangements
 Paul Ebersold – Producer, Engineer, String Arrangements
 Ted Jensen – Mastering
 Chris Johnson – Vocal Producer
 Greg Ladanyi – Engineer
 Matt Martone – Producer, Engineer
 Skidd Mills – Digital Editing
 Josey Scott – Rap vocals on "Brother"
 Edward Sherman – Art Direction
 Mike Shipley – Mixing

References 

2001 debut albums
Breaking Point (band) albums
Wind-up Records albums